The 1st Golden Bell Awards was held on 10 July 1965 at the Zhongshan Hall in Taipei, Taiwan. The ceremony was hosted by Yen Chia-kan.

Winners

References

1965
1965 in Taiwan